Amherst Avenue Historic District is a national historic district located at Ticonderoga, in Essex County, New York. The district contains 16 contributing buildings on ten properties; 10 houses and six garages.  It includes single-family homes built between 1921 and 1923 by W.A. Gale for the Ticonderoga Pulp and Paper Company as rental properties for company management.  Gale also constructed the houses in the Lake George Avenue Historic District.

It was listed on the National Register of Historic Places in 1989.

References

Houses on the National Register of Historic Places in New York (state)
Historic districts on the National Register of Historic Places in New York (state)
Colonial Revival architecture in New York (state)
Houses in Essex County, New York
National Register of Historic Places in Essex County, New York